John Michael Lalor (born March 8, 1963) is an American former professional ice hockey defenceman. Although a U.S. citizen by birth, Lalor spent his youth in Fort Erie, Ontario. Lalor played in the NHL with the Montreal Canadiens, St. Louis Blues, Washington Capitals, Winnipeg Jets, San Jose Sharks and Dallas Stars. He won the Calder Cup in 1985 with Sherbrooke, and a Stanley Cup with the 1986 Canadiens. He currently owns a gym called Teammates Fitness in Wellesley, Massachusetts. Lalor represented the U.S. Hockey Team at the 1996 Men's World Ice Hockey Championships.

Career statistics

Regular season and playoffs

International

External links

1963 births
Brantford Alexanders players
Dallas Stars players
Kalamazoo Wings (1974–2000) players
Living people
Montreal Canadiens players
Nova Scotia Voyageurs players
St. Louis Blues players
San Francisco Spiders players
San Jose Sharks players
Sherbrooke Canadiens players
Stanley Cup champions
Undrafted National Hockey League players
Washington Capitals players
Winnipeg Jets (1979–1996) players
Ice hockey people from Buffalo, New York
Ice hockey people from Ontario
Sportspeople from Fort Erie, Ontario
American men's ice hockey defensemen